The University of Yaoundé was a university in Cameroon, located in Yaoundé, the country's capital.

It was built with the help of France and opened in 1962 as the Federal University of Yaoundé, dropping the "Federal" in 1972 when the country was reorganized.

In 1993 following a university reform the University of Yaounde was split into two (University of Yaoundé I and University of Yaoundé II) following the university branch-model pioneered by the University of Paris.

References

External links
 Université de Yaoundé I Official site
 Université de Yaoundé II Official site

Yaounde
Educational institutions established in 1962
Educational institutions disestablished in 1993
1962 establishments in Cameroon
Yaounde